The Chương Dương Bridge (Cầu Chương Dương, completed 1985) is a major river road bridge in Hanoi, Vietnam. It is 1,213 meters long and has 2 lanes in each direction for vehicles up to 80 tons.

References

Hong River
Bridges in Hanoi
Bridges completed in 1985
Road bridges in Vietnam